

Autonomous bodies, cultural and other institutions 
 
 Agency for Development of Aquaculture, Kerala (ADAK)
 Alappuzha Canal Management Society
 Agency for Non-conventional Energy and Rural Technology (ANERT)
 Co-Operative Academy of Professional Education (CAPE)
 Energy Management Centre (EMC)
 Food Craft Institute - Kerala, under the Dept. of Tourism
 Information Kerala Mission (IKM)
 Institute for Communicative and Cognitive Neurosciences (ICCONS)
 Institute of Handloom and Textile Technology
 Institute of Land Management
 Institute of Management in Government
 Kerala Aviation Training Centre
 Kerala Books and Publications Society
 Kerala Bureau of Industrial Promotion (K-BIP)
 Kerala Council for Historic Research
 Kerala Folklore Akademi
 Kerala Forest Research Institute
 Kerala Government Medical Officers Association (KGMOA)
 Kerala Health Research Welfare Society
 Kerala Industrial Infrastructure Development Corporation
 Kerala Industrial Revitalisation Fund Board
 Kerala Institute of Labour and Employment
 Kerala Institute of Local Administration
 Kerala Institute of Tourism and Travel Studies (KITTS) 
 Kerala Kalamandalam
 Kerala Lalithakala Akademi
 Kerala Police
 Kerala Press Academy
 Kerala Rural Development and Marketing Society
 Kerala Rural Water Supply and Sanitation Agency
 Kerala Sahitya Akademi
 Kerala State Science and Technology Museum
 Kerala State Council for Science, Technology and Environment
 The Kerala State Higher Education Council (KSHEC), Science and Technology Museum Campus, Vikas Bhavan PO, Thiruvananthapuram
 Kerala State Information Technology Mission
 Kerala State Institute of Children’s Literature
 Kerala State Nirmathi Kendra
 Kerala State Pharmacy Council
 Kerala State Planning Board
 Kerala State Pollution Control Board
 Kerala State Remote Sensing and Environment Centre
 Kerala State Social Welfare Advisory Board 
 Kerala State Veterinary Council 
 Kerala State Youth Welfare Board
 Kerala Wakf Board
 Kerala Water Authority
 LBS Centre for Science and Technology
 Malabar Botanical Garden Society
 Malabar Cancer Centre, Thalassery
 Medical Council and Nursing Council
 Multi Purpose Cultural Complex Society
 Nava Kerala Mission
 National Institute of Speech and Hearing (NISH) 
 National Transportation Planning and Research Centre, (NATPAC)
 People’s Action for Development (Kerala)
 Public Sector Restructuring and Internal Audit Board
 Rajiv Gandhi Centre for Biotechnology
 Regional Cancer Centre, Thiruvananthapuram
 Regional Institute of Ophthalmology, Thiruvananthapuram
 Sophisticated Test and Instrumentation Centre
 State Advisory Contract Labour Board
 State Agricultural Prices Board
 State Council of Educational Research and Training (SCERT)
 State Institute of Encyclopedic Publications
 State Institute of Language
 State Institute of Rural Development (SIRD)
 State Resource Centre, Kerala
 Thenmala Eco Tourism Promotion Society
 Theerapatham Urban Development Project, Thiruvananthapuram
 Tropical Botanical Garden and Research Institute, Palode
 Vasthuvidya Gurukulam

Welfare fund boards 
 Kerala Abkari Workers Welfare Fund Board
 Kerala Agricultural Workers Welfare Fund Board
 Kerala Bamboo, Kattuvally and Pandanus Leaf Workers Welfare Fund Board
 Kerala Fishermen Welfare Fund Board
 Kerala Handloom Workers Welfare Fund Board 
 Kerala Tailoring Workers Welfare Fund Board
 Kerala Toddy Wrkers Welfare Fund Board

Universities 
 A P J Abdul Kalam Technological University
 Cochin University of Science and Technology
 Kannur University
 Kerala Agricultural University
 Kerala University of Health Sciences
 Mahatma Gandhi University
 Sree Sankaracharya University of Sanskrit
 University of Calicut
 University of Kerala

References

State Government Organizations
 
Lists of government agencies in India
Public sector in Kerala